Myron McCormick (February 8, 1908 – July 30, 1962) was an American actor of stage, radio and film.

Early life and education
Born in Albany, Indiana, in 1908, Walter Myron McCormick was the middle child of Walter P. and Bessie M. McCormick's three children.  His father, according to the federal census of 1920, was a native of Illinois and a manufacturer of tinware.  He attended New Mexico Military Institute and Princeton University. At the latter he was a member of Phi Beta Kappa Society, gained experience in musical theater, and graduated magna cum laude.

Stage
McCormick was the only cast member of the Broadway smash South Pacific to remain with the show for all 1,925 performances. He won a Best Supporting Performance (Actor) Donaldson Award for 1948-1949 and a 1950 Tony Award for Actor, Supporting or Featured (Musical) for his portrayal of sailor Luther Billis. He later was featured on Broadway from 1955-1957 in the military comedy No Time for Sergeants and repeated his role as Sergeant King for the 1958 film version starring Andy Griffith.

His other Broadway credits include 27 Wagons Full of Cotton (1954), Joy to the World (1947), Soldier's Wife (1944), Storm Operation (1943), The Damask Cheek (1942), Lily of the Valley (1941), Thunder Rock (1939), In Clover (1937), The Wingless Victory (1936), Hell Freezes Over (1935), How Beautiful with Shoes (1935), Substitute for Murder (1935), Paths of Glory (1935), and Carry Nation (1932).

Film 
McCormick portrayed Charlie, the partner of pool shark "Fast Eddie" Felson (Paul Newman) in The Hustler (1961). He also appeared in The Man Who Understood Women, Jigsaw, Jolson Sings Again and The Fight for Life. His screen debut came in Winterset.

Radio and television 
McCormick became a featured performer in the soap opera Buck Private and His Girl and in many popular radio dramas of the 1940s. He also made guest appearances on numerous television programs of the 1950s/early 1960s, including The Untouchables, Naked City, Alfred Hitchcock Presents, The Donna Reed Show,  Way Out and The Iceman Cometh (1960 TV production). McCormick was also known for his portrayal of "Colonel Ralph Bryant" in the 1949 movie Jolson Sings Again.  In 1959 for The Play of the Week television series, he played Joe Saul in Steinbeck's Burning Bright.

Personal life
McCormick was married to actress Martha Hodge and to Barbara MacKenzie.

Death
McCormick died at New York–Presbyterian Hospital in New York City on July 30, 1962, from cancer, aged 54. He was survived by his wife, a son, and a daughter.

Filmography

References

External links
 
 
 Myron McCormick in the 1942 play Lily of the Valley with Katharine Bard

1908 births
1962 deaths
Male actors from Indiana
American male stage actors
American male television actors
American male radio actors
American male film actors
Deaths from cancer in New York (state)
Donaldson Award winners
Tony Award winners
20th-century American male actors
People from Albany, Indiana
Princeton University alumni
Male actors from New York City